The Free the Bears Fund (FBF) is an Australian charitable wildlife-protection organization. It was started by Mary Hutton, after she watched a documentary in 1993 on bears kept in small cages for bile farming. The fund was registered as a not-for-profit charity on 23 March 1995. The Free the Bears Fund supports animal welfare projects in Cambodia, India, Indonesia, Laos, Thailand and Vietnam, working with rescued and confiscated Asian black bear (Ursus thibetanus), sun bear (Helarctos malayanus), and sloth bear (Melursus ursinus). A sister charity Free the Bears UK was established in the United Kingdom in 2010.

History and achievements 
The organization was informally formed in 1993, in response to Australian Television program A Current Affair airing a segment containing footage of moon bears being regularly milked for their bile.

On 23 March 1995 Free the Bears Fund was registered as a not–for-profit charitable organization in Perth, Australia.

The organization fought for several of the Sun bears to be brought to Australia to start a regional breeding program and began construction of the Cambodian Bear Sanctuary at the Phnom Tamao Wildlife Rescue Centre. This is now the world’s largest sanctuary for Sun bears, educating hundreds of thousands of Cambodians about the threats facing their wild bear populations each year.

Further requests for help arrived and Free the Bears was soon involved in projects throughout Southeast Asia and even further afield. Free the Bears soon joined Wildlife SOS and International Animal Rescue in an attempt to rescue India’s "dancing" bears. The first group of 25 rescued bears entered the Agra Bear Rescue Facility on Christmas Eve of 2002. Over the next seven years Free the Bears provided seed money for more than 500 families to abandon the practice of "dancing" bears and adopt new sustainable livelihoods. Less than seven years after the first "dancing" bears were rescued, the last of India’s "dancing" bears was handed over into the sanctuary.

The organization plans to halt the spread of bear bile farming and protect wild bears from the threat of the illegal wildlife trade. With bears in each country facing a unique set of issues that threaten their future, Free the Bears employs a range of strategies including environmental education, conservation research and strengthened law enforcement.

See also 
 Bile bear
 Animals Asia Foundation

References

External links 
 

Animal charities based in Australia
Animal welfare and rights in India
Non-profit organisations based in Western Australia